Tanglewood is a historic house on the western side of Chillicothe, Ohio, United States.  Built in 1850, it features a combination of the Greek Revival and Italianate styles of architecture, and it is one of the best preserved examples of the rare "monitor" style of residential design.

A Catholic clergyman, John McClean, arranged for the house to be built; however, he sold it to Richard Douglas, a local lawyer, before construction was complete.  Douglas owned the property little longer than did McClean, dying soon after it was finished.  The house's most prominent resident was William Edwin Safford, who lived there as a boy; growing to adulthood, he developed a strong reputation as a leading naturalist in the islands of the South Pacific Ocean, and he was later appointed to be the first Vice-Governor of Guam after the United States conquered the island in 1898.

Built of brick on a stone foundation, it is covered with a roof of asphalt, and it features various other elements of brick and iron.  Tanglewood is an elaborate two-and-one-half-story house with many fine Greek Revival elements.  Among its details are multiple pillared porches featuring capitals of the Ionic order, an ornate frieze above the windows, and some elements of the Italianate style that was only just beginning to come into popularity in the middle of the nineteenth century.

In 1979, Tanglewood was listed on the National Register of Historic Places because of its well-preserved historic architecture.  It is one of at least two Ohio monitor houses that is listed on the Register, along with one in the village of St. Paris that is known simply as the "Monitor House."

References

Houses completed in 1850
Buildings and structures in Chillicothe, Ohio
Greek Revival houses in Ohio
Houses on the National Register of Historic Places in Ohio
Italianate architecture in Ohio
Houses in Ross County, Ohio
National Register of Historic Places in Ross County, Ohio